Phyteuma ovatum is a flowering plant in the family Campanulaceae.

References

Campanuloideae
Flora of Europe